The 1933 Michigan Tech Huskies football team represented Michigan Technological University in the 1933 college football season. The Huskies completed the season with a 2–2 record. They played one game against themselves.

Schedule

References

Michigan Tech
Michigan Tech Huskies football seasons
Michigan Tech Huskies football